Moods: Playing with the Elements is an album performed by multi-instrumentalist Joe McPhee's Trio X recorded in 2002 and first released on the CIMP label.

Reception

Allmusic reviewer Steve Loewy states "While there are some wonderful moments on this recording -- McPhee's astonishing sax solo and Rosen's muscular backing on "Wegatchie Run" come to mind—as a whole this set is not as consistently compelling as others in the oeuvre of the group". In JazzTimes Marc Masters wrote "On Moods, McPhee stretches further, playing flugelhorn and pocket trumpet, plus more rippling tenor sax. The trio's patterns also widen: often, one player will retreat completely".

Track listing 
All compositions by Joe McPhee, Dominic Duval and Jay Rosen except as indicated
 "Sienna Sun" - 8:00
 "Wegatchie Run" - 7:22
 "Burning Wood" - 11:21
 "Dedicated to You, Joe" (Dominic Duval) - 3:51 		
 "Stella by Starlight" (Ned Washington, Victor Young) - 6:07
 "In Evidence" - 3:39
 "Lonely Woman" - 2:55
 "Short Eyes" - 4:18
 "Legacy" - 5:23
 "Voices" (Joe McPhee) - 7:38
 "A Valentine in the Fog of War" - 10:56

Personnel 
Joe McPhee - tenor saxophone, flugelhorn, pocket trumpet 
Dominic Duval - bass
Jay Rosen - drums

References 

Trio X albums
2005 albums
CIMP albums